Prince Imperial Yeong, Yi Un, Crown Prince Uimin (also Euimin), also known as Yi Un, Yi Eun, Lee Eun and Un Yi (20 October 1897 – 1 May 1970), was the 28th Head of the Korean Imperial House, an Imperial Japanese Army general and the last crown prince of Korea. In 1910, when the Korean Empire was annexed by Japan and Emperor Sunjong was forced to abdicate, Yi Un was titled His Highness The Crown Prince of Korea. On 10 June 1926, upon the death of Emperor Sunjong, he became His Highness King Yi of Changdeokgung in Japan. Yi Un achieved the rank of Lieutenant General in the Imperial Japanese Army, commanded Japanese forces in China and served as a member of the Supreme War Council. After World War II he was refused entry to Korea, and his Japanese titles were removed by article 14 of the new Constitution of Japan in 1947.

In 1920, he married Princess Masako of Nashimoto (born 4 November 1901 – ), the eldest daughter of Prince Nashimoto Morimasa, on 28 April 1920 at Tokyo.

Early life

The prince was born on 20 October 1897 at Deoksu Palace in Seoul as the seventh son of Gojong, the Gwangmu Emperor. His mother was the Honorable Princess Consort Eom Seon-yeong, a palace attendant, who was posthumously awarded the title of Princess Sunheon. He was also the younger half-brother of Emperor Sunjong and Prince Imperial Ui. He was titled Prince Imperial Yeong in 1900, and became the crown prince in 1907, despite being younger than Prince Ui. Prince Ui's support base at court was not strong because his own mother, Lady Jang, had already died.

In December 1907, he was taken to Japan on the initiative of Itō Hirobumi to be enrolled at Gakushūin Peers' School. The move was meant to ensure that the Korean royal family would not take any further anti-Japanese actions following The Hague Secret Emissary Affair. Japanese Emperor Meiji, who largely ignored his own grandchildren, devoted a lot of attention to Yi Un, acting as his guardian. Itō would bring Yi Un whenever he was visiting the princes Hirohito, Chichibu and Takamatsu. Meiji apparently stopped seeing Yi Un so frequently after Ito's assassination.  Yi Un was allowed to visit Korea again only after the death of his mother in 1911.

Military career
In September 1911, the prince was enrolled in the second year of the Army Central Youth School, a military preparation school located in Tokyo. He was poor in gymnastics due to his small stature, but excelled in music and martial arts. He was then enrolled in the 29th class of the Imperial Japanese Army Academy, from which he graduated on 25 May 1917 with an excellent record.

He was commissioned a second lieutenant in the infantry on 25 December, and steadily rose up the ranks, receiving promotions to lieutenant (April 1920), and captain (July 1923). He graduated from the 35th class of the Army Staff College in November 1923 and commanded a battalion of the Guards 2nd Infantry Regiment. He was assigned to the Imperial Japanese Army General Staff Office in December 1924, and to the staff of the Chosen Army in July 1926. In 1926, he visited Korea in order to visit Sunjong of Korea with his wife. In May 1927, he was sent on an extensive European tour, visiting France, Switzerland, United Kingdom, Belgium, Netherlands, Germany, Denmark, Norway, Sweden, Poland, Austria, Czechoslovakia, Italy, Monaco, and returning to Japan in April 1928. In August, he was promoted to major and in August 1929 became commander of the IJA 1st Infantry Regiment. In December 1930, he was assigned to the Inspectorate General of Military Training and was promoted to lieutenant colonel in August 1932. He became colonel in August 1935 and commanded the Utsunomiya-based IJA 59th Infantry Regiment. From April 1937, he served as an instructor at the Army Academy.

In July 1938, the prince was promoted to major general and from December was assigned to the staff of the North China Area Army, which was engaged in combat operations in northern China following the start of the Second Sino-Japanese War. Throughout the first half of 1939, he made extensive inspection tours of front-line units throughout northern Japan, and reviewed Kwantung Army garrison units in Manchukuo. In August, he was appointed commander of the Guards 2nd Brigade and in May 1940 was commander of the reserve Fourth Depot Division. He was promoted to lieutenant general in December. In July 1941, he was appointed commander of the IJA 51st Division also based in Utsunomiya.

Under his command, the division relocated to Manchukuo to participate in the Special exercise of the Kwantung Army (actually a mobilization for the possible large-scale conflict with the Soviet Union). The preparations for the war with the Soviet Union were officially cancelled in August 1941. In September, the division was transferred to Guangdong under command of IJA 23rd Army. He returned to a post on the staff of the Inspectorate General of Military Training in November.

From August 1942, the prince was transferred to the Imperial Japanese Army Air Force and became commander of the 1st Air Army from July 1943. In April 1945, he became a member of the Supreme War Council.

Later life
Following the surrender of Japan, Yi Un lost his royal status under the American Occupation of Japan in 1947. He was also declared stateless, as Korea had become independent of the Empire of Japan, but Korean President Syngman Rhee had refused his request to be allowed to return to Korea with his family. In May 1957, following the end of the American occupation, he acquired Japanese citizenship and travelled to the United States the same month. In March 1959, while still in the United States, he suffered from a stroke. He returned to Japan in May. In 1960, President Rhee again denied him permission to return to Korea, but instead offered the prince the position of Korean Ambassador to the Court of St. James's. He refused on the grounds of illness, but made a trip to New York from June to August 1960, and to Hawaii from March to May 1961. His health deteriorating rapidly, he was hospitalized in Tokyo from August 1961.

In November 1963, President Park Chung-hee granted permission for Prince Yi Eun and Crown Princess Bangja to return to Korea. By that time, Prince Yi Eun was unconscious from cerebral thrombosis. He received treatment at St. Mary's Hospital in Seoul.

In his final years, Prince Yi Eun lived at Nakseon Hall, Changdeokgung Palace, the former residence of the Korean Imperial Family in Seoul, with Bangja and his younger sister Princess Deokhye. Seven years after returning to his country, he died on 1 May 1970 at Nakseon Hall, Changdeok Palace, Seoul. He was buried at Hongreung in Namyangju, near Seoul; he is known posthumously as Yi Un, Crown Prince Euimin of Korea. He was enshrined as a deity in the Jongmyo shrine on 6 May 1973.

Children
 Yi Jin (born 18 August 1921 – ), the elder son of Prince Eun and his wife, Princess Bangja. He died abruptly during a visit to Korea with his parents, fueling conspiracy theories. His funeral was held on 17 May 1922 and he is buried in Korea. 
 Yi Gu (born 29 December 1929 – ), the second son of Prince Eun and his wife, Princess Bangja. Prince Gu became the 29th Head of the Korean Imperial Household upon the death of his father. He married Julia Mullock, an American citizen (b. 1928) on 25 October 1959 at St George's Church in New York, they had no issue but adopted a daughter, Eugenia Unsuk Lee (Eun-sook) (b. 1959).

Honours
 : Grand Cordon of the Order of the Golden Ruler - 17 April 1900
: Grand Cordon of the Order of the Rising Sun, with Paulownia Flowers – 17 October 1907
 : Grand Cross of the Order of the Dannebrog – 10 November 1927
 : Commander Grand Cross of the Order of Vasa, with Collar – 13 November 1927
 : Grand Cross of the Order of the White Lion – 16 December 1927

In popular culture
 Portrayed by Park Soo-young in the 2016 period drama film The Last Princess.

References

1897 births
1970 deaths
People from Seoul
House of Yi
Heirs apparent who never acceded
South Korean Roman Catholics
Japanese nobility
Pretenders to the Korean throne
Korean nobility
Japanese generals
Zainichi Korean people
Korean princes
Korean anti-communists
Recipients of the Order of the Rising Sun with Paulownia Flowers
Recipients of the Order of the Golden Kite
Grand Crosses of the Order of the Dannebrog
Knights Grand Cross of the Order of Saints Maurice and Lazarus
Recipients of the Order of the Netherlands Lion
Grand Crosses of the Order of Vasa
Honorary Knights Grand Cross of the Order of the British Empire
Grand Crosses of the Order of the White Lion
Sons of emperors
Recipients of the Order of the Plum Blossom